Kutigi is a town in central Nigeria, border to Bida, makwo and north of the Niger River. The countryside is generally flat with rolling hills, with grassland and trees.

It is the headquarters of Lavun Local Government Area in Niger State, Nigeria.

This is a place situated in Lavun, with a geographical coordinates are 9° 12' 0" North, 5° 36' 0" East
and its original name (with diacritics) is Kutigi. it's a Nupe, speaking area.

References

Populated places in Niger State